Henry I of Orléans-Longueville (1568 – April 8, 1595) was a French aristocrat and military and Grand Chamberlain of France between 1589 and 1595.

Biography
Henry was the eldest son of Léonor d'Orléans, duc de Longueville (1540–1573) and Marie de Bourbon, duchess of Estouteville and countess of Saint-Pol (1539–1601). He succeeded his father in 1573 as Duke of Longueville, Prince of Neuchâtel, Count of Saint-Pol, Count of Dunois and Tancarville. On 1 March 1588, he married Catherine Gonzaga (1568–1629), daughter of Louis Gonzaga, Duke of Nevers, and had one son, Henry II.

Henry was governor of Picardie and defeated the forces of the Catholic League under Charles, Duke of Aumale at Senlis in May 1589. When Henry III was assassinated later that year, Longueville pledged loyalty to his successor Henry IV of France and received command over the forces in Picardy and became Grand Chamberlain of France.

Longueville died in Amiens in 1595.

The funerary monument for him and his son by François Anguier, can be seen in the Louvre Museum.

He was the loose inspiration behind the character of Longueville in William Shakespeare's Love's Labour's Lost.

References

Sources

External links
 His funerary monument in the Louvre

External list 
 Liste des ducs de Longueville

Princes of Neuchâtel
1568 births
1595 deaths
Constables of France
House of Valois
Dukes of Longueville
Dukes of Estouteville
Counts of Saint-Pol
Counts of Dunois
Grand Chamberlains of France